Sache or Saché may refer to:

Places
Saché, Indre-et-Loire, a commune in France
Sache, Ethiopia, a town in Supena Sodo woreda, Oromoia Region, Ethiopia
Dôme de la Sache, mountain in Savoie, France

Other uses
 Saché, a character in the Star Wars series
 Sač, a cooking utensil
Mike Jones (rapper), American rapper who previously used the name "Sache"

See also